Philip of France might refer to:
Philip I of France (1053–1108), King of France
Philip of France (1116–1131), co-king of France, son of Louis the Fat
Philip of France, Archdeacon of Paris  (1132–1161), son of Louis the Fat
Philip II of France, known as Philip Augustus, (1165–1223), King of France
Philippe Hurepel (1200–1234), count of Boulogne, son of Philip II of France
Philip of France (1209–1218), son of Louis VIII of France
Philip of France (1218–1220), son of Louis VIII of France
Philip Dagobert (1222–1232), son of Louis VIII of France
Philip III of France (1245–1285), called Philip the Bold, King of France
Philip IV of France (1268–1314), called Philip the Fair, King of France
Philip V of France (1291–1322), called Philip the Tall, King of France
Philip of France (1313–1321), son of Philip V of France
Philip VI of France (1293–1349), called Philip of Valois, King of France
Philip of Valois, Duke of Orléans (1336–1375), son of Philip VI of France
Philip II, Duke of Burgundy (1342–1404), son of John II of France
Philip of France (1407–1407), son of Charles VI of France
Philip de France (1436–1436), son of Charles VII of France
Philippe I, Duke of Orléans (1640–1701), son of Louis XIII of France
Philip of France (1668–1671), duke of Anjou, son of Louis XIV of France
Philip V of Spain (1683–1746), grandson of Louis XIV of France